Dong Wenfei is a Chinese Sanda fighter and kickboxer who competes in the Featherweight and Lightweight divisions. Dong is a multiple provincial and national Sanshou titlist in China; he acquired an amateur Sanshou record of 37-13. Dong later switched to kickboxing.

In 2009, Dong won the  Guangdong International Wushu champion. He fought in the Rally Competition in the Lightweight competition between China and Thailand in 2009. In February 2012, he was selected for the Chinese Wushu  Team and joined Da Dong Xiang Fight Club in 2013.

In 2011 Dong was the champion in the  category at the World Wushu Championship; he also placed first in both the China Wushu Championship and the Chinese Warrior in WLF. He was the runner-up in three championships in 2010, 2012, and 2014.

Dong has fought against Andy Souwer, Albert Kraus, Aikpracha Meenayothin and Buakaw Banchamek in K-1 Rule.

Career 

On May 9, 2009, at Wulinfeng, Dong beat Ge Xukun by KO.

On December 19, 2009, at the Kung Fu vs Muaythai Championships held at Lingnan Pearl Stadium, the second scene was Dong versus BigBen in the  class. Due to the disadvantage of wrestling, Dong lost to BigBen by a decision.

On the evening of 31 March 2011, at the Wuxing World Championship -Wulin King's Competition for Hegemony in Jiangmen, Guangdong, Dong beat Arthit Hanchana by decision.

On the evening of April 19, 2011, at the finals of the championship of the Chinese Sanshou Championship held in Wuyishan Stadium, Fujian, Dong beat Ye by decision, winning the Chinese Sanshou Champion  class.

On November 1, 2011, Chinese Kung Fu King Championship were held in Haikou Stadium, Hainan, Dong beat Zhao by TKO, winning the Chinese Kung Fu King Champion 70 kg.

On September 25, 2012, Guangyuan International Kickboxing Championship were held in Golden Seed Stadium, Anhui, Dong beat Vladimir by decision.

On December 31, 2012, Wu Lin Feng World Championship were held in Beijing University of Science and Technology Gymnasium, In quarter finals Dong beat Gustavo Mendes by KO, in semi finals, he beat Zhou by decision, but in the final he lost to Albert Kraus by TKO.

On June 6, 2013, at the Wu Lin Feng World Championship held in Dubai Convention and Exhibition Center, UAE, Dong versus Mohammed Salem. Dong used a low kick to knock Salem down several times, then Salem's referee submitted in the first round.

On August 10, 2013, at the MAX Muay Thai held in a Henan television studio, Dong fought Buakaw Banchamek; he lost following a split decision from the judges.

On January 18, 2014, at the Wu Lin Feng World Championship held in Xiangyang, Hubei, Dong beat Michael Krcmar and Sun but in the final he lost to Seyedisa Alamdarnezam by decision.

On April 29, 2014, at commemorations for the 95th anniversary of the May 4th movement held in Xiangcheng, Henan, Dong was awarded 2014 Top Ten Outstanding Youth in the Eighth Urban Event.

Championships and awards 

 Kickboxing
 2018 S-1 Muaythai Welterweight World Champion 71 kg 
 2015 WLF Intercontinental Champion 75 kg
 2014 WLF 4 Man Tournament Runner-up
 2014 WLF-World 8 Man Tournament -70 kg Runner-up
 2012 WLF Chinese Warriors 70 kg 
 2012 WLF-World 8 Man Tournament -70 kg Runner-up
 2010 WLF-World 8 Man Tournament -70 kg Runner-up
 Sanshou
 2011 Chinese Kung Fu King 70 kg 
 2011 Chinese Sanshou  Champion 70 kg
 2009 Guangdong International Wushu champion

Kickboxing record 

|-
|- style="background:#fbb;"
|2019-07-21
|Loss
| align="left" | Daisuke Fujimura 
| KRUSH 103
|Japan
|Decision (Unanimous)
|3
|3:00
|-
|- style="background:#cfc;"
|2019-01-19
|Win
| align="left" | Alex Bublea
|Wu Lin Feng
|Haikou, China
|TKO (3 Knockdowns)
|1
|1:20
|-
|- style="background:#cfc;"
|2018-12-08
|Win
| align="left" | Daoden Korat
|S1 World Championships & Wu Lin Feng
|Chum Saeng, Thailand
|TKO (Punches)
|2
|
|-
! style=background:white colspan=9 |Wins the 2018 S-1 Muaythai Welterweight World Champion 71kg 
|- style="background:#cfc;"
|2018-11-07
|Win
| align="left" | Ruslan
|Wu Lin Feng
|Hong Kong, China
|KO (Overhand Left)
|1
|
|-
|- style="background:#cfc;"
|2018-10-06
|Win
| align="left" | Giannis Boukis
|Wu Lin Feng
|Huiyang, China
|Decision (Unanimous)
|3
|3:00
|-
|- style="background:#cfc;"
|2018-05-05
|Win
| align="left" | Dima Weimer
|Wu Lin Feng
|Nanyang, China
|Decision (Unanimous)
|3
|3:00
|-
|- style="background:#cfc;"
|2018-04-07
|Win
| align="left" | Will Jope
|East of Dragon
|Weifang, China
|Decision (Unanimous)
|3
|3:00
|-
! style=background:white colspan=9 |
|- style="background:#cfc;"
|2016-01-02
|Win
| align="left" | Steve Mansworth
|Wu Lin Feng
|Hong Kong, China
|Decision (Unanimous)
|3
|3:00
|-
|- style="background:#cfc;"
|2015-12-12
|Win
| align="left" | Alexei Florov
|Wu Lin Feng
|Beijing, China
|TKO (Cut)
|2
|
|-
|- style="background:#cfc;"
|2015-10-24
|Win
| align="left" | Warren Stevelmans
|Wu Lin Feng
|Hong Kong, China
|Decision (Unanimous)
|3
|3:00
|-
|- style="background:#cfc;"
|2015-09-05
|Win
| align="left" | Masashi Fukuda
|Wu Lin Feng
|Guangzhou, China
|KO (Punch)
|1
|
|-
|- style="background:#cfc;"
|2015-08-29
|Win
| align="left" | Kai Chee
|Wu Lin Feng
|Zhoukou, China
|N/A
|N/A
|N/A
|-
|- style="background:#cfc;"
|2015-08-08
|Win
| align="left" |
|Wu Lin Feng
|Xi'an, China
|N/A
|N/A
|N/A
|-
|- style="background:#fbb;"
|2015-04-04
|Loss
| align="left" | Andy Souwer
|Wu Lin Feng
|Zhengzhou, China
|Decision (Unanimous)
|3
|3:00
|-
|- style="background:#cfc;"
|2015-03-28
|Win
| align="left" | Thodkhui MR.Manas
|Wu Lin Feng
|Zhumadian, China
|Decision (Unanimous)
|3
|3:00
|-
|- style="background:#cfc;"
|2015-03-07
|Win
| align="left" | Phayakkhaphon Thong Kham
|Wu Lin Feng
|Zhengzhou, China
|Decision (Unanimous)
|3
|3:00
|-
|- style="background:#cfc;"
|2014-12-27
|Win
| align="left" | Haws Bin
|Wu Lin Feng
|Pingdingshan, China
|TKO (Low Kick)
|1
|1:50
|-
|- style="background:#cfc;"
|2014-12-19
|Win
| align="left" |N/A
|Wu Lin Feng
|Weinang, China
|Decision (Unanimous)
|3
|3:00
|-
|- style="background:#cfc;"
|2014-11-16
|Win
| align="left" | Alonso
|Wu Lin Feng
|Changsha, China
|Decision (Unanimous)
|3
|3:00
|-
|- style="background:#fbb;"
|2014-03-15
|Loss
| align="left" | Harley Love
|Wu Lin Feng-4 Man Tournament, Final
|Auckland, New Zealand
|TKO (Flying Knee)
|1
|0:30
|-
|- style="background:#cfc;"
|2014-03-15
|Win
| align="left" | Ricky Campbell
|Wu Lin Feng-4 Man Tournament, Semi Finals
|Auckland, New Zealand
|Decision (Unanimous)
|3
|3:00
|-
|- style="background:#fbb;"
|2014-01-18
|Loss
| align="left" | Seyedisa Alamdarnezam
|Wu Lin Feng-70 kg Tournament,Final
|Xiangyang, China
|Decision (Unanimous)
|3
|3:00
|-
|-
|- style="background:#cfc;"
|2014-01-18
|Win
| align="left" | Sun Weiqiang
|Wu Lin Feng-70 kg Tournament, Semi Finals
|Xiangyang, China
|Decision (Unanimous)
|3
|3:00
|-
|- style="background:#cfc;"
|2014-01-18
|Win
| align="left" | Michael Krcmar
|Wu Lin Feng-70 kg Tournament, Quarter Finals
|Xiangyang, China
|Decision (Split)
|3
|3:00
|-
|- style="background:#cfc;"
|2013-11-27
|Win
| align="left" | Jose Neto
|Wu Lin Feng
|Anyang, China
|Decision (Unanimous)
|3
|3:00
|-
|- style="background:#cfc;"
|2013-11-22
|Win
| align="left" | Simone Ballerini
|Wu Lin Feng
|Langfang, China
|Decision (Unanimous)
|3
|3:00
|-
|- style="background:#fbb;"
|2013-11-02
|Loss
| align="left" | Raul Rodriguez
|Wu Lin Feng
|Las Vegas, US
|Decision (Split)
|3
|3:00
|-
|- style="background:#cfc;"
|2013-08-24
|Win
| align="left" | Valdet Gates
|Wu Lin Feng
|Huaibei, China
|Decision (Unanimous)
|3
|3:00
|-
|- style="background:#fbb;"
|2013-08-10
|Loss
| align="left" | Buakaw Banchamek
|MAX Muay Thai 3
|Zhengzhou, China
|Decision (Split)
|3
|3:00
|-
|- style="background:#cfc;"
|2013-06-06
|Win
| align="left" | Mohammed Salem
|Wu Lin Feng
|Dubai, UAE
|TKO (Throw in the towel)
|1
|1:23
|-
|- style="background:#cfc;"
|2013-05-09
|Win
| align="left" | Jackson Alves
|Wu Lin Feng
|Nanyang, China
|Decision (Unanimous)
|3
|3:00
|-
|- style="background:#fbb;"
|2013-04-25
|Loss
| align="left" | Sonchai Me.Mai
|Wu Lin Feng
|Zhengzhou, China
|Decision (Unanimous)
|3
|3:00
|-
|- style="background:#cfc;"
|2013-03-31
|Win
| align="left" | Bangrajun Por. Pramuk
|Wu Lin Feng
|Taizhou, China
|Decision (Unanimous)
|3
|3:00
|-
|- style="background:#fbb;"
|2012-12-31
|Loss
| align="left" | Albert Kraus
|Wu Lin Feng-70 kg Tournament, Final
|Beijing, China
|TKO (High Kick)
|2
|2:45
|-
|- style="background:#cfc;"
|2012-12-31
|Win
| align="left" | Zhou Zhipeng
|Wu Lin Feng-70 kg Tournament, Semi Finals
|Beijing, China
|Decision (Unanimous)
|3
|3:00
|-
|- style="background:#cfc;"
|2012-12-31
|Win
| align="left" | Gustavo Mendes
|Wu Lin Feng-70 kg Tournament, Quarter Finals
|Beijing, China
|TKO (Punch)
|2
|1:00
|-
|- style="background:#fbb;"
|2012-10-20
|Loss
| align="left" | Theerawat Yoohanngoh
|Wu Lin Feng
|Zhengzhou, China
|DQ (Kneed in the groin)
|2
|0:20
|-
|- style="background:#cfc;"
|2012-09-25
|Win
| align="left" | Vladimir
|Guangyuan International Kickboxing Championship
|Hefei, China
|Decision (Unanimous)
|3
|3:00
|-
|- style="background:#cfc;"
|2012-09-14
|Win
| align="left" | Xiao Kaiyu
|Wu Lin Feng
|Zhengzhou, China
|KO (Punch)
|1
|2:40
|-
|- style="background:#cfc;"
|2012-08-03
|Win
| align="left" | Wang Xuguang
|Wu Lin Feng
|Zhengzhou, China
|KO (Knee)
|3
|0:35
|-
|- style="background:#cfc;"
|2012-06-23
|Win
| align="left" | Ibrahimov
|Wu Lin Feng-Wu Xing Tian Xia
|Foshan, China
|Decision (Unanimous)
|3
|3:00
|-
|- style="background:#cfc;"
|2012-05-12
|Win
| align="left" | Sheng Hui
|Wu Lin Feng
|Zhengzhou, China
|TKO (Low Kick)
|2
|2:25
|-
|- style="background:#fbb;"
|2011-11-10
|Loss
| align="left" | Aikpracha Meenayothin
|Kung Fu vs Muaythai
|Haikou, China
|TKO (Punch)
|2
|0:20
|-
|- style="background:#cfc;"
|2011-11-01
|Win
| align="left" | Zhao Eridemutu
|Chinese Kung Fu King Championship Final
|Haikou, China
|TKO (Punch)
|1
|0:50
|-
|- style="background:#cfc;"
|2011-10-30
|Win
| align="left" | Zhao Shuai
|Chinese Kung Fu King Championship Semi-finals
|Haikou, China
|TKO (Low Kick)
|2
|0:34
|-
|- style="background:#cfc;"
|2011-04-29
|Win
| align="left" | Mohammed
|Wu Lin Feng-Wu Xing Tian Xia
|Jiangmen, China
|Decision (Unanimous)
|3
|3:00
|-
|- style="background:#cfc;"
|2011-03-31
|Win
| align="left" | Arthit Hanchana
|Wu Lin Feng-Wu Xing Tian Xia
|Jiangmen, China
|Decision (Unanimous)
|3
|3:00
|-
|- style="background:#cfc;"
|2010-10-15
|Win
| align="left" | Zhu Aiwei
|CKA
|Weinan, China
|Decision (Unanimous)
|5
|2:00
|-
|- style="background:#fbb;"
|2010-05-28
|Loss
| align="left" | Vuyisile Colossa
|Wu Lin Feng-2010 WLF World Championship Final
|Zhengzhou, China
|Ex.R Decision (Unanimous)
|4
|3:00
|-
|- style="background:#cfc;"
|2010-04-24
|Win
| align="left" | Zhao Yafei
|Wu Lin Feng-2010 WLF World Championship Semi-finals
|Zhengzhou, China
|Decision (Unanimous)
|3
|3:00
|-
|- style="background:#cfc;"
|2010-01-17
|Win
| align="left" | Zhang Kenan
|CKA
|Hangzhou, China
|Decision (Unanimous)
|5
|2:00
|-
|- style="background:#cfc;"
|2010-01-16
|Win
| align="left" | Zhou Jiankun
|CKA
|Hangzhou, China
|Decision (Unanimous)
|5
|2:00
|-
|- style="background:#fbb;"
|2009-12-19
|Loss
| align="left" | Big Ben Chor Praram 6
|Kung Fu vs Muaythai
|Foshan, China
|Decision (Unanimous)
|3
|3:00
|-
|- style="background:#cfc;"
|2009-11-07
|Win
| align="left" | Shao Yalei
|CKA
|Baoding, China
|Decision (Unanimous)
|5
|2:00
|-
|- style="background:#cfc;"
|2009-09-12
|Win
| align="left" | Xiao Jie
|Wu Lin Feng
|Zhengzhou, China
|TKO (Punch)
|2
|1:40
|-
|- style="background:#cfc;"
|2009-06-26
|Win
| align="left" |
|Wu Lin Zheng Ba
|Guangzhou, China
|TKO (Throw in the towel)
|2
|1:10
|-
|- style="background:#cfc;"
|2009-06-18
|Win
| align="left" | Zhou Jiankun
|CKA
|Beijing, China
|Decision (Unanimous)
|5
|2:00
|-
|- style="background:#cfc;"
|2009-06-12
|Win
| align="left" | Shao Yalei
|CKA
|Beijing, China
|Decision (Unanimous)
|5
|2:00
|-
|- style="background:#cfc;"
|2009-05-23
|Win
| align="left" | Vuyisile Colossa
|Wu Lin Feng
|Zhengzhou, China
|Decision (Unanimous)
|3
|3:00
|-
|- style="background:#cfc;"
|2009-05-09
|Win
| align="left" | Ge Xukun
|Wu Lin Feng
|Zhengzhou, China
|KO (Knee)
|1
|1:00
|-
|- style="background:#cfc;"
|2009-05-02
|Win
| align="left" | Zhang Houzhen
|Wu Lin Feng
|Zhengzhou, China
|Decision (Unanimous)
|3
|3:00
|-
|- style="background:#cfc;"
|2009-04-25
|Win
| align="left" | Zhu Aiwei
|Wu Lin Feng
|Zhengzhou, China
|KO (Knee)
|1
|1:08
|-
|- style="background:#cfc;"
|2009-04-18
|Win
| align="left" | Zhao He
|Wu Lin Feng
|Zhengzhou, China
|Decision (Unanimous)
|3
|3:00
|-
|- style="background:#fbb;"
|2009-04-04
|Loss
| align="left" | Zhou Jiankun
|Wu Lin Feng
|Zhengzhou, China
|Decision (Unanimous)
|3
|3:00
|-
|- style="background:#cfc;"
|2009-03-28
|Win
| align="left" | Chen Qian
|Wu Lin Feng
|Zhengzhou, China
|KO (Knee)
|2
|1:08
|-
|- style="background:#cfc;"
|2009-03-21
|Win
| align="left" | Du Guangqiang
|Wu Lin Feng
|Zhengzhou, China
|TKO (High Kick)
|2
|1:37
|-
|- style="background:#fbb;"
|2009-01-03
|Loss
| align="left" | Wei Shoulei
|Wu Lin Feng
|Zhengzhou, China
|Decision (Unanimous)
|3
|3:00
|-
|- style="background:#cfc;"
|2008-12-27
|Win
| align="left" | Xiao Jijian
|Wu Lin Feng
|Zhengzhou, China
|KO (Punch)
|1
|0:42
|- style="background:#fbb;"
|2008-08-30
|Loss
| align="left" | Wei Shoulei
|Wu Lin Feng
|Zhengzhou, China
|Decision (Unanimous)
|3
|3:00
|-
|- style="background:#fbb;"
|2008-07-19
|Loss
| align="left" | Xu Xizhen
|Wu Lin Feng
|Zhengzhou, China
|Decision (Unanimous)
|3
|3:00
|-
|- style="background:#cfc;"
|2008-07-05
|Win
| align="left" | Wang Xuyang
|Wu Lin Feng
|Zhengzhou, China
|Decision (Unanimous)
|3
|3:00
|-
|-
| colspan=9 | Legend:

References 

Chinese male kickboxers
1990 births
Living people
Chinese sanshou practitioners
People from Zhoukou
Sportspeople from Henan